I'm Free may refer to:

Music 
 I'm Free (album), an album by Ray Parker Jr
 "I'm Free" (Rolling Stones song), 1965, covered in 1989 by The Soup Dragons
 "I'm Free" (The Who song), 1969
 "I'm Free", a song by Donna Summer from Cats Without Claws
 "I'm Free", a song by Jon Secada from Jon Secada
 "I'm Free", a song by Pimp C from Pimpalation
 "I'm Free", a song by Scatman John from Everybody Jam!
 "I'm Free (Heaven Helps the Man)", a 1984 song by Kenny Loggins from the Footloose soundtrack

Television 
 "I'm free!", the catchphrase of Mr. Humphries in the British sitcom Are You Being Served?